Ian Cameron (born 23 May 1988) is a Scottish football coach who serves as the head coach of USL League One club South Georgia Tormenta.

Playing career
He represented the Scottish U16, Scotland U17, and Scotland U18 national teams. He had a spell as a player with Partick Thistle. Cameron played four years of college soccer at Mercer University between 2007 and 2010, making 67 appearances, scoring 17 goals and tallying 16 assists. He also played in the USL PDL with Indiana Invaders in 2010.

Following his college career, Cameron returned to Glasgow and earned a master’s degree in Quantitative Finance from the University of Glasgow in 2012.

Coaching career
Cameron was named assistant coach at his alma mater Mercer University in 2013, where he spent three years. In 2016, Cameron became head coach to Eckerd College.

On 17 September 2018, it was announced that Cameron would coach USL League Two side South Georgia Tormenta 2 whilst remaining at Eckerd College. He also coached in the Tormenta Academy and served as an assistant with the first team, in addition to his head coaching role with the second team. Cameron was named head coach of the club's USL League One side South Georgia Tormenta on 16 September 2020. On 12 May 2022, Cameron was named USL League One Coach of the Month for April 2022. Cameron signed multi-year contract extension with Tormenta on 14 December 2022.

Personal life
He is the son of former professional footballer Ian Cameron. His sister Kayleigh played for women's football teams including Celtic.

References

1988 births
Living people
Footballers from Glasgow
Association football midfielders
Scottish footballers
Scottish expatriate footballers
Scottish expatriate sportspeople in the United States
Expatriate soccer players in the United States
Mercer Bears men's soccer players
Indiana Invaders players
USL League One coaches
USL League Two players
Alumni of the University of Glasgow
Partick Thistle F.C. players
Eckerd Tritons men's soccer coaches
Mercer Bears men's soccer coaches